Adolf Vécsey (also known as Adolf Weber; 13 June 1916 – 1979) was a Hungarian football player who played as a goalkeeper.

Career
Adolf Vécsey contracted to Nagyváradi AC at the beginning of the 1940s after a career started at Salgótarján and continued at Kispest. At NAC he was the number one goalkeeper of the 1943-44 season, when the green and whites won the Hungarian Championship. After World War II, he returned to Oradea. At the end of the 1948-49 season he won again the championship, now in Romania.

In 1952, in Bucharest, they played a championship match against Dinamo București. The opponent's coach, Iuliu Baratky, former football player born in Oradea and also NAC former player, sent the midfielders on the pitch with the tactical advice to annoy Vécsey until he was defeated. The goalkeeper tolerated for a while, the five insults, but at one point he succumbed, the striker immediately dashed out and Vécsey was eliminated by the referee. The 1-1 match was lost 3-1 because of the big free spaces appeared by the goalkeeper's absence. Vécsey was forbidden by the football association forever and his active career ended at the age of 37.

After returning to Hungary he wanted to start his career as a coach, but he quickly realized that this would not work for him. After that, for years he lived in Budapest, than he moved in the West Germany and lived in Frankfurt until the age of 64 when he died of gastric cancer.

References

 Dr. Demjén László: A Nagyváradi AC a magyar nemzeti bajnokságban 1941-44 (1989), 166–170. o.
 Dénes Tamás, Peterdi Pál, Rochy Zoltán, Selmeci József: Kalandozó magyar labdarúgók

External links
 Adolf Vécsey at nela.hu
 Adolf Vécsey at labtof.ro
 Adolf Vécsey at magyafutball.hu

1915 births
1979 deaths
Footballers from Budapest
Hungarian footballers
Association football goalkeepers
Salgótarjáni BTC footballers
Budapest Honvéd FC players
CA Oradea players
Pécsi VSK footballers
Nemzeti Bajnokság I players
Liga I players
Hungarian expatriate footballers
Hungarian expatriate sportspeople in Romania
Expatriate footballers in Romania
Hungarian emigrants to Germany